Mamonov is a Russian masculine surname, its feminine counterpart is Mamonova. It may refer to:

Aleksei Mamonov (born 1993), Russian football player
Alexander Dmitriev-Mamonov (1758–1803), Russian noble
Anton Mamonov (born 1989), Russian football player
Dmitriy Mamonov (born 1978), Kazakhstani football manager and a former player
Matvey Dmitriev-Mamonov (1790–1863), Russian noble and writer, son of Alexander
Nikolay Mamonov, Soviet speedskater
Pyotr Mamonov (1951–2021), Russian rock musician 
Tatiana Mamonova, Russian feminist 
Vladimirs Mamonovs (born 1980), Latvian ice hockey player
Yuri Mamonov (1958–2022), Russian politician

Russian-language surnames